The Central Sierra League is a high school athletic league that is part of the CIF Central Section.  The league consists of small schools and plays 8 man football.

Members
 Alpaugh High School
 Northwest Christian High School
 Faith Christian Academy
 Riverdale Christian High School

References

CIF Central Section